The Golden Throne is a  mountain in Capitol Reef National Park in Wayne County, Utah, United States. It is a rock formation dome made of a gold color stained Navajo Sandstone, which is particularly special because normally the sandstone is creamy white or red. The presence of a small amount of the Carmel Formation on top of the Navajo Sandstone is the reason for this staining.

A  trail runs below the mountain.

See also

 List of mountains in Utah

References

External links

 Golden Throne. gjhikes.com.

Mountains of Utah
Mountains of Wayne County, Utah
Capitol Reef National Park